The pink frogmouth or redeye, Chaunax pictus, is a sea toad of the family Chaunacidae, found around the world on continental shelves in tropical and temperate waters, at depths of between 200 and 660 m.  Its length is up to 40 cm. It can be distinguish from present species with a black, deeply concave illicial cavity, and an esca that is black anterodosally and pale or white posteroventrally.

References

 
 Tony Ayling & Geoffrey Cox, Collins Guide to the Sea Fishes of New Zealand,  (William Collins Publishers Ltd, Auckland, New Zealand 1982) 
Caruso, John H. “Systematics and Distribution of the Atlantic Chaunacid Anglerfishes (Pisces: Lophiiformes).” Copeia, vol. 1989, no. 1, 1989, pp. 153–165. JSTOR, www.jstor.org/stable/1445616. Accessed 6 Mar. 2020.

Chaunacidae
Fish of the Atlantic Ocean
Fish of the Indian Ocean
Fish of the Pacific Ocean
Taxa named by Richard Thomas Lowe
Fish described in 1846